The Stockholm Institute of Education  was a university college in Stockholm, Sweden that was founded in 1956. It was incorporated into Stockholm University on January 1, 2008.

External links 
Stockholm Institute of Education - Official site

Stockholm University
1956 establishments in Sweden
2008 disestablishments in Sweden
Defunct universities and colleges in Sweden